Adult Contemporary is a chart published by Billboard ranking the top-performing songs in the United States in the adult contemporary music (AC) market.  In 1981, 20 songs topped the chart, based on playlists submitted by radio stations.

In the year's first issue of Billboard the number one position was held by British singer Leo Sayer with "More Than I Can Say", which retained the top spot from the last week of 1980.  It remained atop the chart for two weeks in 1981 before being replaced by "I Love a Rainy Night" by country singer Eddie Rabbitt, which also topped Billboards all-genres chart, the Hot 100.  Rabbitt's song was one of two tracks which reached the number one spot on both the AC and country charts as well as on the Hot 100 during the early part of 1981, along with Dolly Parton's "9 to 5".  The two songs were among just four country songs to top the Hot 100 during the 1980s, and the only two to do so consecutively.  Soon after Parton's song exited the number one position on the AC listing, Scottish singer Sheena Easton topped the chart with "Morning Train (9 to 5)".  In her native United Kingdom, the song had been a top ten hit under the title "9 to 5", but it was given a new title for the U.S. market to avoid confusion with Parton's identically-titled song.

Parton's song "9 to 5" was the theme song from the film of the same name, in which the singer starred, and was one of three AC number ones of 1981 to be taken from film soundtracks.  In September Diana Ross and Lionel Richie topped the chart with their duet "Endless Love" from the film of the same name, and this was immediately followed into the number one position by "Arthur's Theme (Best That You Can Do)" by Christopher Cross, from the film Arthur.  The longest-running number one of the year was "I Don't Need You" by Kenny Rogers, which spent six weeks in the top spot.  Rogers was one of only two artists to have more than one AC number one in 1981, and his eight weeks atop the chart was the most by any artist.  The only other act with multiple number ones during the year was Neil Diamond, who had the final number one of 1981 with "Yesterday's Songs", which held the top spot for the last two weeks of the year.

Chart history

References

See also
1981 in music
List of artists who reached number one on the U.S. Adult Contemporary chart

1981
1981 record charts
1981 in American music